Pornainen is a small municipality of Finland. It is located in the province of Southern Finland and is part of the Uusimaa region. The neighboring municipalities are Askola in the east, Mäntsälä in the north, Porvoo in the southeast and Sipoo in the southwest.

The administrative centre of municipality is Kirveskoski (about 2,000 residents), also known as Pornainen's church village, and second largest village is Halkia (about 500 residents).

Movies and scenes for TV productions and short films have been filmed in Pornainen from the 1930s to the present day. In the publications of film industry, Pornainen was once named the most photographed locality in Finland, that is why the municipality marketed itself under the nickname "Hollywood of Finland". The village of Laukkoski is known as a summer destination for many former celebrities, such as actress Regina Linnanheimo, and writers Mika Waltari and Juhani Aho.

The municipality is unilingually Finnish.

Politics
Results of the 2011 Finnish parliamentary election in Pornainen:

True Finns   25.4%
Social Democratic Party   22.8%
National Coalition Party   20.6%
Centre Party   18.1%
Green League   5.4%
Left Alliance   3.6%
Christian Democrats   1.6%
Swedish People's Party   1.5%

Notable people
 Wiljo Tuompo (1893–1957)
 Seppo Aho (born 1944)
 Joona Sotala (born 1998)

References

External links

Municipality of Pornainen – Official website 

Municipalities of Uusimaa
Greater Helsinki
Populated places established in 1869
1869 establishments in the Russian Empire